Sir Charles Justin MacCarthy (1811–1864) was the 12th Governor of British Ceylon and the 12th Accountant General and Controller of Revenue. He was appointed on 22 October 1860 and was Governor until 1 December 1863. He also served as acting governor on two separate occasions. He was first appointed in 1850.

Life
His parents were Donough and Mary MacCarthy, and he was born in Brighton. He was a relation of Nicholas Wiseman, and in the early 1830s was in Rome, with a view to entering the Roman Catholic priesthood. Under the influence of the ideas of Lamennais, however, he ceased theological studies. In Rome through Wiseman he met Monckton Milnes, who became a lifelong friend. Milnes then helped him into a colonial career.

MacCarthy was knighted in 1857. In office he adopted a policy of financial retrenchment. His main aim was to promote railway construction. He left Ceylon in December 1863, in poor health. He died at Spa, Belgium on 15 August 1864.

Family
MacCarthy married in 1848 Sophia Brunel Hawes, botanist and eldest daughter of Sir Benjamin Hawes. They had a son, Charles Philip.

References

1811 births
1864 deaths
Auditors General of Sri Lanka
Governors of British Ceylon
British expatriates in Sri Lanka
19th-century British people
Chief Secretaries of Ceylon
British colonial governors and administrators in Asia